Instinct is a gay men's lifestyle magazine that was a physical publication from 1997 to 2015 and is an online magazine that was launched in 2013 and is still active today. The physical magazine was first published in 1997 by Instinct Publishing and was distributed by Curtis Circulation. Instinct launched its online component in June 2013, covering entertainment, news, original content, fun features, and travel. The final physical issue was dated June–July 2015.

Instinct was purchased by Juki Media, LLC in 2015.

References

External links
 

1997 establishments in California
2015 disestablishments in California
LGBT-related magazines published in the United States
Monthly magazines published in the United States
Defunct magazines published in the United States
Gay men's magazines
Magazines established in 1997
Magazines disestablished in 2015
Magazines published in California